The 1973–74 NBA season was the Lakers' 26th season in the NBA and 14th season in Los Angeles. Having lost to the New York Knicks in the previous season's NBA Finals, the Lakers would make it to the NBA Playoffs, posting a 47-35 record, only to lose to the Milwaukee Bucks in five games.

Following the season, Jerry West retired after 14 seasons with the Lakers. He would later return to the Lakers as the head coach from 1976 to 1979.

Offseason

Draft picks

Roster

Regular season

Season standings

z – clinched division title
y – clinched division title
x – clinched playoff spot

Record vs. opponents

Game log

Playoffs

|- align="center" bgcolor="#ffcccc"
| 1
| March 29
| @ Milwaukee
| L 95–99
| Gail Goodrich (31)
| Connie Hawkins (14)
| Gail Goodrich (6)
| Milwaukee Arena10,938
| 0–1
|- align="center" bgcolor="#ffcccc"
| 2
| March 31
| @ Milwaukee
| L 90–109
| Gail Goodrich (21)
| Happy Hairston (10)
| Happy Hairston (7)
| Milwaukee Arena10,938
| 0–2
|- align="center" bgcolor="#ccffcc"
| 3
| April 2
| Milwaukee
| W 98–96
| Elmore Smith (30)
| Elmore Smith (17)
| Gail Goodrich (12)
| The Forum17,505
| 1–2
|- align="center" bgcolor="#ffcccc"
| 4
| April 4
| Milwaukee
| L 90–112
| Elmore Smith (20)
| Elmore Smith (13)
| Connie Hawkins (5)
| The Forum
| 1–3
|- align="center" bgcolor="#ffcccc"
| 5
| April 7
| @ Milwaukee
| L 92–114
| Gail Goodrich (22)
| Happy Hairston (11)
| Gail Goodrich (6)
| Milwaukee Arena10,938
| 1–4
|-

Awards and records
 Gail Goodrich, All-NBA First Team
 Gail Goodrich, NBA All-Star Game
 Jerry West, NBA All-Star Game

References

Los Angeles
Los Angeles Lakers seasons
Los Angle
Los Angle